Oliver Dingley (born 24 November 1992) is an international diver who represents Ireland. He represented Ireland at the 2016 Summer Olympics. In doing so, he became the first Irish Diver to compete at the Olympics in 68 years. RTÉ’s highest rating sports event at the 2016 Olympics was Dingley’s 3m springboard final, with an average of 388,000 viewers. Dingley has won numerous national and international medals.

Career
Dingley came to prominence in 2008 when he became the youngest ever Men's British Champion on the 1 metre springboard (aged 15). He went on to win the same title in 2009, 2011 and 2013. He also won gold on in the 3 metre Springboard event at the British Cup in 2010. Despite his five titles, Dingley was never selected for a World Championship or a World Cup. In 2012, Dingley competed in the Great Britain Olympic Trials for the London Olympic Games where he finished second. Unfortunately for Dingley, the diver who placed third was selected instead. 2014 saw Dingley qualify for the 3 metre springboard event at the 2014 Commonwealth Games in Glasgow. He went on to win a bronze medal. An ecstatic Dingley was quoted in the press after the event, saying “I am so proud, this medal means so much after the disappointment of not being selected for London”. Following the Games, it was reported in a newspaper that Dingley had decided to switch nations and compete for Ireland. In October 2014, Dingley publicly announced he had decided to represent Ireland, with Dingley's coach also announcing he would be relocating to Ireland to continue coaching Dingley. Dingley qualifies to represent Ireland  through his grandmother.

In November 2014, Dingley won the Irish Open on both the 1 metre and 3 metre springboard events.

In February 2016, Dingley qualified for the 2016 Summer Olympics, the first Irish diver to do so since 1948 (68 years). There, Dingley became the first Irish diver to qualify for an Olympic final, progressing to the end of the 3m individual springboard event, finishing in 8th position.

References

External links
 
 
 
 
 
 

1992 births
Living people
Sportspeople from Harrogate
Irish male divers
Commonwealth Games bronze medallists for England
Divers at the 2014 Commonwealth Games
English people of Irish descent
Divers at the 2016 Summer Olympics
Olympic divers of Ireland
Commonwealth Games medallists in diving
Divers at the 2020 Summer Olympics
Medallists at the 2014 Commonwealth Games